The Social Liberal Humanist Party (PUSL), formerly Humanist Power Party (Social-Liberal) (PPU-SL) is a centrist to centre-left political party in Romania. It was founded in 2015 by members of the Conservative Party (PC) who did not want to merge with the Liberal Reformist Party (PLR), led by Călin Popescu-Tăriceanu.

History 
In the summer of 2015, the Conservative Party (PC), led by Daniel Constantin, merged with the Liberal Reformist Party (PLR), creating the Alliance of Liberals and Democrats (ALDE). At the same time, PC MEP Maria Grapini opposed this decision, criticizing the disappearance of the party's ideology and announced that she would join a new group, the Party of Humanist Power (PPU).

Controversy 
In 2018, former Sector 4 mayor, Cristian Popescu Piedone join PPU and reentered politics, having previously been prosecuted for the Colectiv nightclub fire back in 2015. He was accounted responsible and in 2019 sentenced to 8 years in prison, but the sentence was not decisive and was attacked by the Bucharest Court of Appeal. With all the legal problems and controversy surrounding Piedone, PPU still endorsed him as candidate in the 2016 Romanian local elections for mayor of Sector 4 as well as in the 2020 Romanian local elections for mayor of Sector 5, winning the latter.

Electoral history

Legislative elections

Notes:

1  The MPs were elected on the PSD and ALDE lists.

2  The MPs were elected on the PSD list.

Local elections

National results

Mayor of Bucharest 

Notes:

1 PSD candidate, Gabriela Firea, was endorsed by PPU

Presidential elections

References

External links

2015 establishments in Romania
Centrist parties in Romania
Humanist Party
Liberal parties in Romania
Political parties established in 2015
Registered political parties in Romania
Social liberal parties